Postans is an unpopulated suburb of Perth, Western Australia, located within the City of Kwinana.

The suburb is named after George Postans who was one of the first settlers in the area. He arrived in the Colony as a convict in 1850 and after he was released he bought  of land in 1882. The suburb was formerly known as "Caledonia".

An agriculture research station known as "Medina Research Station", part of the Department of Agriculture and Food of the state government of Western Australia, is located in the suburb.

The suburb is otherwise dominated by several quarries, a tailing pond of the nearby Alcoa alumina refinery and a facility called the "Kwinana Wastewater Treatment Plant".

References

External links

Suburbs of Perth, Western Australia